Dahewan is a village in the Borsad taluka of Anand district in Gujarat state of India. Dahewan is a Gram Panchayat. It was ruled by Koli king Zalim Jalia.

History 
Dehwan was a Mehvasi village which was ruled by Koli king Jalim Jaliya and Dehwan's chief fought against Baroda State to protect the Nawab of Broach.

Education

Colleges 
 Degree Pharmacy College, Amralali

Schools 
 Shri H.G.N.Dahevanvala Sarswati Vidhyalaya, Dahevan 
 Hanifa public school, Kashipura
 Vatsalya International School, Borsad
 Madresa Gujrati School (non girl), Borsad
 Napavanta Mishra Shala, Napa Vanta village

Religious Places

Hindu 
 Shiva Mandir, Kathana Station
 Somnath Mahadev Mandir, Kathana Station
 Harsidhdhi Temple, Chandanpura
 Valiyadeva Temple, Chandanpura

Muslim 
 Noorani Masji, Kalamsar
 Nagina Masjid (Sunni), Khanpur
 Masjid, Ranoli

See also
Zalim Jalia

References 

Villages in Anand district
Geography of Gujarat